An  (plural) is a traditional Belgian and Dutch beignet.

Name
In France, with  they are also commonly called  (literally: fast beignets) and croustillons hollandais (loosely: Dutch crispies). In English they are more commonly known as Dutch doughnuts or dutchies. In Italy, they are called in many different ways and it depends on the Region: bombolini fritti, ficattole, bignoli, frittoli (or fritole/fritule), sgabei, bignet, panzanelle, coccoli, zonzelle, donzelle and so on. In Serbia they are called . In Portugal they are called  (dreams). "white man's dumplings". In Nigeria, they are known as 'puff puff'.

Description
Oliebollen are a variety of dumpling made by using an ice cream scoop or two spoons to scoop a certain amount of dough and dropping the dough into a deep fryer filled with hot oil (or once with hot lard, thus some traditional local names). In this way, a sphere-shaped oliebol emerges. Oliebollen are traditionally eaten on New Year's Eve and at funfairs. In wintertime, they are also sold in the street at mobile stalls.

The dough is made from flour, eggs, yeast, some salt, milk, baking powder and usually sultanas, currants, raisins and sometimes zest or succade (candied fruit). A notable variety is the appelbeignet which contains only a slice of apple, but different from oliebollen, the dough should not rise for at least an hour. Oliebollen are usually served with powdered sugar.

In Flanders the "oliebol" is also called "smoutebol" because it is often cooked in animal fat (especially lard) rather than vegetable oil. Another difference between the Dutch oliebol and the Flemish smoutebol is that the smoutebol is usually not filled in contrast to the Dutch oliebol.
The filling of the oliebol could consist of raisins, currants and apple, other ingredients can be added, such as succade, pieces of orange or whipped cream.

Origin
The origins of oliebollen are not entirely clear.  They are said by some to have been first eaten by Germanic tribes in Belgium and the Netherlands during the Yule, the period between December 26 and January 6 where such baked goods were used.  It has also been speculated that they were introduced to the Netherlands in the 15th century by Portuguese Sephardi Jewish immigrants; the food being related to the Jewish sufganiyah traditionally eaten on Hanukkah. The earliest discovered recipe of oliekoecken ("oil cookies", the direct precursor of the oliebol) came from the 1667 Dutch book De verstandige kock "The sensible cook".

Variations

From oliekoek to oliebol

For centuries the Dutch ate oliekoek ("oil cookie"), an old name for oliebol ("oil ball"). The Oliebollen in this painting from around 1652 are very similar to today's oliebol. At that time, they were baked in lard or rapeseed oil. During the nineteenth century the word "oliebol" started to be used more. The 1868 edition of the Van Dale dictionary included word "oliebol", whereas the rival "Woordenboek der Nederlandsche taal" didn't include it until 1896, stating that "oliekoek" is a more commonly used term, but a major shift in usage occurred: from the early twentieth century the word "oliebol" became the popular word, while "oliekoek" was no longer in use.

Croustillons
A very similar type of oliebol can also be found in the Walloon part of Belgium, Brussels and northern France. Croustillons are deep fried dough balls served hot and liberally sprinkled with powdered sugar. They are usually served in a paper cone with a little plastic fork to eat them with. They are typically found at fairgrounds in Belgium and in Lille, France.

Oliebollentest contest
From 1993 to 2017 Dutch newspaper Algemeen Dagblad has held an annual highly publicized oliebollentest at the end of each year. In 2012, the bakery of Willy Olink from Maarssen won the test. In 2013 Richard Visser won the test for the ninth time in twenty years which is currently the record for the highest number of wins by one person. The test stopped in 2018 after it appeared that the jury and the writers of the reviews were not the same people and the articles in the newspaper didn't reflect the reality and were exaggerated.  Fans of the treat continued reviewing oliebollen from all over the country by themselves, compiling their ratings on a website.

See also
 List of doughnut varieties
 

, a similar Danish dish

References

External links

Belgian cuisine
Dutch pastries
Doughnuts
Dutch words and phrases
Holiday foods
Christmas food
Carnival foods
Sephardi Jewish culture in Belgium